Joel Etienne-Clark (born 10 October 1986) is former footballer who played as a midfielder. Born in England, he represented the Dominica national team internationally.

Club career
Born in Chelmsford, Etienne-Clark began his career in the academy at Leyton Orient, before leaving to sign for hometown club Chelmsford City in 2004, making his debut in a 3–0 win against Slough Town on 23 October 2004, after progressing from Chelmsford's youth ranks. Etienne-Clark spent the remainder of the 2004–05 season out on loan to Great Wakering Rovers. Ahead of the 2005–06 season, Etienne-Clark joined Great Wakering in a permanent basis, making 97 league appearances over the course of two years, scoring eight times. In 2007, Etienne-Clark signed for Waltham Forest, scoring three times in 18 appearances, before re-signing for Chelmsford the following year. In October 2008, following a short spell with Dartford, he rejoined Great Wakering Rovers, making his 100th appearance at the club in the process. In 2009, Etienne-Clark briefly joined Maldon Town, before signing for Leyton later that year. In 2010, Tilbury signed Etienne-Clark, before the midfielder joined Lingfield the following season. In 2012, Etienne-Clark signed for Ilford.

International career
Etienne-Clark made his debut for Dominica in a March 2008 FIFA World Cup qualification match against Barbados. In total, Etienne-Clark made six appearances for Dominica.

Style of play
Upon signing for Tilbury in August 2010, Tilbury manager Paul Vaughan described Etienne-Clark as a player with "pace and ability", who can "play wide or in behind the front two".

References

1986 births
Living people
English footballers
People with acquired Dominica citizenship
Dominica footballers
Dominica international footballers
English sportspeople of Jamaican descent
English people of Dominica descent
Association football midfielders
Leyton Orient F.C. players
Chelmsford City F.C. players
Great Wakering Rovers F.C. players
Waltham Forest F.C. players
Dartford F.C. players
Maldon & Tiptree F.C. players
Leyton F.C. players
Tilbury F.C. players
Lingfield F.C. players
Ilford F.C. players
Isthmian League players

Sportspeople from Chelmsford
Black British sportspeople